Greta De Reyghere is a Belgian soprano who specializes in early music and Baroque music in historically informed performance but also performs a variety of other classical music in concert. She is a teacher at the Royal Conservatory of Liège.

Career 
Born in Malines, De Reyghere studied voice at the Brussels Conservatory, where she received diplomas in concert singing, opera and art song. She continued her studies with Alfred Deller and Erik Werba.

De Reyghere recorded in 1992 Bach's motets with Sigiswald Kuijken and La Petite Bande. She has collaborated in the 1980s and 1990s with the ensemble Ricercar Consort conducted by Philippe Pierlot, performing choral music with one voice per part. They recorded several Bach cantatas, including in 1995 Christ lag in Todes Banden, BWV 4.

In 1999 she sang Flos carmeli, Op. 106, a church cantata for soprano, women's choir and small orchestra, by the Bruges composer Joseph Ryelandt, with Ignace Michiels at the organ. In 2000 they recorded Bach's four short masses, with Wilke te Brummelstroete, James Gilchrist and Jan van der Crabben. Works by Mozart included his Vesperae solennes de Dominica and Vesperae solennes de confessore. In 2003 the focus was on works by Joseph-Hector Fiocco, his Missa solemnis in D and Homo quidam. A reviewer of a recording of motets and psalm settings by Felix Mendelssohn noted her "under-statement and beauty of line and texture".

De Reyghere has been a voice teacher at the Royal Conservatory of Liège. Among her students is soprano Sophie Karthäuser.

Selected recordings

With La Petite Bande
 1989: Bach: Magnificat, BWV 243, and cantata Ich hatte viel Bekümmernis, BWV 21, with the Nederlands Kamerchoor
 2010 : Carl Philipp Emanuel Bach: Die letzten Leiden des Erlösers, with Collegium Vocale Gent

With Ricercar Consort
 1988: Oeuvres pour le Port-Royal de Marc-Antoine Charpentier, with Jill Feldman, Isabelle Poulenard and Bernard Foccroulle
 1988: Deutsche Barock Kantaten (III) (works by Franz Tunder, Johann Hermann Schein, Buxtehude), with Agnès Mellon
 1989: Deutsche Barock Kantaten (V) (Christmas cantatas by Andreas Hammerschmidt, Thomas Selle, Schein, Schütz, Tunder, Weckmann), with Agnès Mellon and Dominique Visse
 1989: Motets à deux voix by Henri Dumont, with Agnès Mellon, James Bowman, Guy de Mey and Max van Egmond
 1992: Die Familie Bach, with Collegium Vocale et Capella Sancti Michaelis
 1995: Matthäus Passion (1672) by Johann Sebastiani (Deutsche Barock Kantaten XI)

Other 
 1983: Les Oiseaux French and German art songs by Beethoven, Schubert, Brahms, Strauss, Wolf, Berg, Mozart, Gounod, Berlioz, Chausson, de Falla, Milhaud, Ravel, Poulenc, Werfel; with Benjamin Rawitz, piano. Zephyr Records Z19.
 1987: Church Cantatas and Arias by Telemann, with Telemann Consort and Vokaal Ensemble Rundadinella, Gent, conducted by Florian Heyerick
 1993: Requiem in C major and Miserere in E minor by Johann Adolph Hasse, with Il Fondamento, conducted by Paul Dombrecht

References

External links 
 Greta De Reyghere (in Flemish) muziekcentrum.be
 Greta De Reyghere / Selective discography muziekcentrum.be

Belgian sopranos
Bach singers
Living people
20th-century Belgian women singers
20th-century Belgian singers
20th-century classical musicians
21st-century Belgian women singers
21st-century Belgian singers
21st-century classical musicians
Year of birth missing (living people)